Metrication, the process of introducing the metric system of measurement in place of imperial units, has made steady progress in the United Kingdom since the mid-20th century but today remains equivocal and varies by context. Most of government, industry and commerce use metric units, but imperial units are officially used to specify journey distances, vehicle speeds and the sizes of returnable milk containers, beer and cider glasses, and fresh milk is often still sold in multiples of pints, with the metric equivalent also marked. Imperial units are also often used to describe body measurements and vehicle fuel economy. In schools, metric units are taught and used as the norm. Imperial units that remain in common usage in the UK are also taught.

Adopting the metric system was discussed in Parliament as early as 1818 and some industries and government agencies had metricated, or were in the process of metricating by the mid-1960s. A formal government policy to support metrication was agreed by 1965.  This policy, initiated in response to requests from industry, was to support voluntary metrication, with costs picked up where they fell. In 1969, the government created the Metrication Board as a quango to promote and coordinate metrication. In 1978, after some carpet retailers reverted to pricing by the square yard rather than the square metre, government policy shifted, and they started issuing orders making metrication mandatory in certain sectors. In 1980, government policy shifted again to prefer voluntary metrication, and the Metrication Board was abolished. By the time the Metrication Board was wound up, all the economic sectors that fell within its remit except road signage and parts of the retail trade sector had metricated.   
 
The treaty of accession to the European Economic Community (EEC), which the United Kingdom joined in 1973, obliged the United Kingdom to incorporate into domestic law all EEC directives, including the use of a prescribed SI-based set of units for many purposes within five years. By 1980, most pre-packaged goods were sold using the prescribed units. Mandatory use of prescribed units for retail sales took effect in 1995 for packaged goods and in 2000 for goods sold loose by weight. The use of "supplementary indications" or alternative units (generally the traditional imperial units formerly used) was originally to have been permitted for only a limited period. That period being extended a number of times due to public resistance, until in 2009 the requirement to ultimately cease use of traditional units alongside metric units was finally removed.

British scientists, philosophers and engineers have been at the forefront of the development of metrication – in 1861 a committee of the British Association for Advancement of Science (BAAS), including William Thomson (later Lord Kelvin), James Clerk Maxwell and Joule among its members, defined various electrical units in terms of metric rather than imperial units, and in the 1870s Johnson, Matthey & Co manufactured the international prototype metre and kilogram.

History

Before 1799
When James VI of Scotland inherited the English throne in 1603, England and Scotland had different systems of measure. Superficially the English and the Scots units of measure were similar – many had the same names – but there were differences in their sizes: in particular the Scots pint and gallon were more than twice the size of their English counterparts. In 1707, under the Act of Union, the Parliaments of England and Scotland were merged and the English units of measurement became the standard for the whole new Kingdom of Great Britain. The practical effect of this was that both systems were used in Scotland, and the Scottish measures remained in common use until the Weights and Measures Act 1824 outlawed them.

This period marked the Age of Enlightenment, when people started using the power of reason to reform society and advance knowledge. Britons played their role in the realm of measurement, laying down practical and philosophical foundations for a decimal system of measurement which were ultimately to provide the building blocks of the metric system.

One of the earliest decimal measuring devices, developed in 1620 by the English clergyman and mathematician Edmund Gunter, introduced two new units of measure – the chain and the link – and a new measuring device: Gunter's chain. The decimal nature of these units and of the device made it easy to calculate the area of a rectangle of land in acres and decimal fractions of an acre.

Having difficulties in communicating with German scientists, the Scottish inventor James Watt, in 1783, called for the creation of a global decimal measurement system. A letter of invitation, in 1790, from the French National Assembly to the British Parliament, to help create such a system using the length of a pendulum as the base unit of length received the support of the British Parliament, championed by John Riggs Miller, but when the French overthrew their monarchy and decided to use the meridional definition of the metre as their base unit, Britain withdrew support. The French continued alone and created the foundations of what is now called the Système International d'Unités and is the measurement system for most of the world.

1799–1962

A few days later Wrottesley met with Gladstone, then Chancellor of the Exchequer, but was unable to win him over to the idea. The inherent problems associated with handling multiple currencies and systems of units encountered in the  Great Exhibition of 1851 triggered calls for a standardisation of units across Europe with the metric system being suggested as the natural choice. In 1854, de Morgan was influential in setting up the "Decimal Association" to lobby for decimalisation of both measurement and coinage. In 1862, the Select Committee on Weights and Measures favoured the introduction of decimalisation to accompany the introduction of metric weights and measures. A further Royal Commission "on the question of the introduction of metric system of weights and measures" also reported in 1869.

In 1863, a bill which would have mandated the use of the metric system throughout the British Empire, and which had passed its first and second readings in the House of Commons, was rejected at its Commons Committee stage as impractical, and so did not pass into law. The following year, after pressure from the astronomers George Airy and Sir John Herschel, the bill was watered down to merely legalise the use of the metric system in contracts. It was presented and passed as a Private Member's Bill. Ambiguous wording in the 1864 Act meant that traders who possessed metric weights and measures were still liable to arrest under the Weights and Measures Act 1835 (5 & 6 Will 4 c. 63).

While the politicians were discussing whether or not to adopt the metric system, British scientists were in the forefront in developing the system. In 1845, a paper by James Prescott Joule proved the equivalence of mechanical and thermal energy, a concept that is vital to the metric system – in SI, power is measured in watts and energy in joules regardless of whether it is mechanical, electrical or thermal. By contrast, units such as the horsepower, British Thermal Unit, gasoline gallon equivalent, and foot-pound have no logical relationship to one another, as these units (or those they were based upon) were independently defined before dimensional analysis was understood.

In 1861, a committee of the British Association for Advancement of Science (BAAS) including William Thomson (later Lord Kelvin), James Clerk Maxwell and Joule among its members was tasked with investigating the "Standards of Electrical Resistance". In their first report (1862), they laid the ground rules for their work – the metric system was to be used and measures of electrical energy must have the same units as measures of mechanical energy. 
In the second report (1863), they introduced the concept of a coherent system of units whereby units of length, mass and time were identified as "fundamental units" (now known as base units). 
All other units of measure could be derived (hence derived units) from these base units.

In 1873, another committee of the BAAS that also counted Maxwell and Thomson among its members and was tasked with "the Selection and Nomenclature of Dynamical and Electrical Units". They recommended the CGS (centimetre-gram-second) system of units. The committee also recommended the names "dyne" and "erg" for the CGS units of force and energy. The CGS system became the basis for scientific work for the next seventy years.

In 1875, a British delegation was one of twenty national delegations to a convention in Paris that resulted in seventeen of the nations signing the Metre Convention on 20 May 1875, and the establishment of three bodies, the CGPM, CIPM and BIPM, that were charged with overseeing weights and measures on behalf of the international community. The United Kingdom was one of the countries that declined to sign the convention. In 1882 the British firm Johnson, Matthey & Co secured an agreement with the French government to supply 30 standard metres and 40 standard kilograms. Two years later the United Kingdom signed the treaty and the following year it was found that the standard yard which had been in use since 1855 had been shrinking at the rate of one part per million every twenty years. In 1889, one of the standard metres and one of the standard kilograms that had been cast by Johnson, Matthey & Co were selected at random as the reference standard and the other standards, having been cross-correlated with each other, were distributed to the signatory nations of the treaty.

In 1896, Parliament passed the Weights and Measures (Metric System) Act, legalising metric units for all purposes but not making them compulsory.

The situation was clarified in 1897 following another Select Committee which also recommended that metrication become compulsory by 1899. In 1902, an Empire conference decided that metrication should be compulsory across the British Empire. In 1904, scientist Lord Kelvin led a campaign for metrication and collected 8 million signatures of British subjects. On the opposition side, 1904 saw the establishment of the British Weights and Measures Association for "the purpose of defending and, where practicable, improving the present system of weights and measures". At this time 45% of British exports were to metricated countries. Parliament voted to set up a Select Committee on the matter.

This Select Committee reported in 1907 and a bill was drafted proposing compulsory metrication by 1910, including decimalisation of coinage.

The matter was dropped in the face of wars and depression, and would not be again raised until the White Paper of 1951, the result of the Hodgson Committee Report of 1949 which unanimously recommended compulsory metrication and currency decimalisation within ten years. The report said "The real problem facing Great Britain is not whether to adhere either to the Imperial or to the metric system, but whether to maintain two legal systems or to abolish the Imperial." The report also recommended that any change should be implemented in concert with the Commonwealth (former Empire) and the US, that the United Kingdom adopt a decimal currency and that the United Kingdom and United States harmonise their respective definitions of the yard using the metre as a reference. The Hodgson Report was originally rejected by British industry, but in 1959 the United Kingdom and United States redefined their respective yards to be 0.9144 m exactly.

1962 onwards

The British Standards Institution (BSI) chose to stimulate metrication discussion in May 1962 by issuing a short statement on the subject. The introduction of the metric system was a topic at the Fifth Commonwealth Standards Conference that was held in Sydney in October 1962. Also in October 1963, the BSI, based on the results of inquiries by its committees, stated that their view was that changes in the field of measurement were inevitable. They also stated that they thought these changes should be channelled towards the metric system becoming the primary weights and measures system for the UK as soon as possible.

In 1965, the then Federation of British Industry informed the British Government that its members favoured the adoption of the metric system, though some sectors emphasised the need for a voluntary system of adoption. The Board of Trade, on behalf of the Government, agreed to support a ten-year metrication programme. There would be minimal legislation as the programme was to be voluntary and costs were to be borne where they fell.

Work on adapting specifications started almost as soon as the government first gave its approval in 1965. The BSI took the lead in coordinating the efforts of industry, and where appropriate working with the International Organization for Standardization (ISO), CEE, CEN and CENELEC while the Royal Society liaised with professional societies, schools and the like. Initially the BSI targeted 1,200 basic standards which were converted to metric units by 1970. Most of the remaining 4,000 standards were converted in the ensuing five years.

There were three principal ways in which metrication was implemented:
Hard metrication which resulted in new products based on round metric quantities – for example A4 paper replaced both foolscap and quarto paper and in rugby union 5-, 10-, and 22-metre lines replaced the 5-, 10-, and 25-yard lines respectively.
Soft metrication where existing standards were rewritten using metric units. This approach was used where any radical changes would have been impractical.
Revision of measurement techniques were introduced in cases where the concepts behind the existing standard or practice were found to be archaic. One such revision was to define the strength of alcoholic drink as a percentage alcohol by volume rather than, in the case of whisky, in "degrees proof" (described by Lord Brown as being "based on a test that involves the burning of a given quantity of gunpowder").

The Metrication Board

In July 1968, following the publication of a report from the Standing Joint Committee on Metrication, the government announced that an advisory metrication board would be set up as soon as possible, to oversee the metrication process, with a target completion date of the end of 1975. The report favoured the board being made up of part-time members drawn from commerce and industry, with government, education and consumer interests also being represented. In December 1968, the government announced the set-up of the Metrication Board to coordinate the metrication programme, with Lord Ritchie-Calder being appointed as chairman. By this time much of the groundwork, especially rewriting of many British Standards using metric units, had been done and many of the industries that stood to benefit from metrication had already metricated, or had a metrication programme in progress.

Policy review
The general election of 18 June 1970 resulted in a change of government and four months later, on 27 October 1970, following an anti-metrication motion being tabled calling on the newly elected Conservative Party government not to continue with the previous government's metrication commitments, the government announced that a White Paper would be produced to examine the cost, savings, advantages and disadvantages of a change to the metric system. During the debate when the announcement was made, Conservative MPs complained that metrication was being introduced by stealth.

The White Paper on Metrication was published in February 1972, and it set out the case for metrication and refuted the charge of metrication by stealth as metric units had been lawful for most purposes since 1897. It also reported that metrication would be necessary for the UK to join the European Common Market and that as British industry was exporting to all parts of the world they would benefit. It also reiterated the previous government's policy that metrication should be voluntary and hoped metrication would be mostly complete within ten years. The expectation was also expressed that with both the imperial and metric systems coexisting for many years, that consumers would gradually become familiar and comfortable with the metric system.

Progress
Shortly after the publication of the White Paper, the Minister of Transport announced postponement of the metrication of speed limits, which had been scheduled for 1973. The rest of the metrication programme continued, with the following completion dates:
1970 Electric Cable Makers Confederation, British Aerospace Companies Limited drawing and documentation, London Metal Exchange, flat glass
1971 Paper and board, National Coal Board designs, pharmaceuticals
1972 Paint industry, steel industry, building regulations
1974 Textile and wool transactions, leading clothing manufacturers adopt dual units
1975 Retail trade in fabrics and floor coverings, post office tariffs, medical practice
1976 Bulk sales of petroleum, agriculture and horticulture
1977 Livestock auctions
1978 Solid fuel retailing, cheese wholesaling, bread, London Commodity Market

Yet the target of completion by 1975 "in concert with the Commonwealth" was not achieved; Australia, New Zealand and South Africa all completed their metrication processes by 1980.

Education 

In England and Wales, unlike Scotland, education was controlled at county council level rather than at national level. In 1967 the Department for Education alerted all local education authorities to the need to adapt to the metric system. In 1968 all bodies that had an interest in the examination system were invited to contribute to the discussion of both metrication and decimalisation in education. In science subjects, this meant a conversion from the cgs system to SI, in geography from the imperial system to SI while in mathematics it meant discarding the teaching of mixed unit arithmetic, a topic that took up a significant part of the time allocated in primary schools to arithmetic/mathematics and 7% of total time allocated to all subjects.

In Scotland, virtually all examinations set from 1973 onwards have used SI, especially those connected with science and engineering. In England, each examination board had its own timetable – the Oxford Delegacy of Local Examinations, for example, announced a change to SI in 1968, with examinations in science and mathematics using SI by 1972, Geography in 1973 and Home Economics and various craft subjects being converted by the end of 1976. Pupils were hampered by a revolution in teaching methods that was taking place at the same time and a lack of coordination at the national level. According to a report in 1982, children were taught the relationship between decimal counting, decimal money and metric measurements, with time being the only quantity whose units were manipulated in a mixed-unit manner.

The year 1988 saw the introduction, in England, Wales and Northern Ireland of the National Curriculum, in which SI is the principal system of measurement and calculation. Following devolution, there are now separate but similar curricula for state schools in England and Wales and Northern Ireland. They provide for pupils to be taught to measure, calculate and solve problems using the metric system, but also to be cognisant of the Imperial measurements still in common use and their approximate metric equivalents.

Scotland has always had a separate education system Curriculum for Excellence and there the units of measurement taught in education are the SI or metric system.

Wholesale, retail and consumer industries

The retail industry proved difficult for the Metrication Board. The sector saw little benefit in metrication – competition was fierce and margins low. The opinions of the trade organisations with which the Metrication Board could negotiate were fragmented.

Many sectors of the industry did agree to a programme coordinated by the Metrication Board, with metrication of pre-packaged goods being introduced on a commodity by commodity basis. In 1977 when a carpet retailing chain reneged on an industry-wide agreement to use metric units (carpeting at £8.36 per square yard looked more appealing in price to the customer than carpeting at £10.00 per square metre), it became necessary for the first time to use legislation to enforce metrication rather than to rely on a voluntary adoption of the system.

Much of the retail industry was metricated during 1977 and 1978 by means of statutory orders.

By the beginning of 1980, 95% of the "basic shopping basket" of foods were sold in metric quantities, with only a few products not being sold in prescribed metric quantities. The final report of the Metrication Board catalogues dried vegetables, dried fruit, flour and flour products, oat products, cocoa and chocolate powder, margarine, instant coffee, pasta, biscuits, bread, sugar, corn flakes, salt, white fats, dripping and shredded suet as being sold by prescribed metric quantities while no agreement had been reached with the industry regarding jam, marmalade, honey, jelly preserves, syrup, cereal grain and starches.

When the Metrication Board was abolished in 1980, agreement had been reached with the EEC regarding the use of certain imperial measures until the end of 1989, a date that was subsequently extended to 1999. By this date most pre-packaged goods were sold in metric quantities with loose goods and goods weighed in front of the customer continuing to be sold in imperial quantities. In 1999, when the British Government allowed the derogation for the use of imperial units to lapse, all goods (apart from beer, cider and milk in returnable containers) had to be priced in metric units.

The changeover to selling of petrol by the litre rather than by the gallon took place after the Board was wound up. It was prompted by a technical shortcoming of petrol pump design: pumps (which were electro-mechanical) had been designed to be switchable between metric and imperial units, but had no provisions for prices above £1.999 per unit of fuel. Once the price of petrol rose above £1 per gallon, the industry requested that they be permitted to sell fuel by the litre rather than the gallon, enabling them to reduce the unit price by a factor of about 4.5 and so to extend the lives of existing pumps.

In the United Kingdom, draught beer and cider are the only goods that may not be sold in metric units. Since 2011, the legal measures for these are  pint (189 ml),  pint (284 ml),  pint (379 ml), and subsequent multiples of the half-pint.

Other sectors

Before the Hodgson Committee, the metrication process was already in operation. One example was the Ordnance Survey, the national mapping agency for Great Britain, which initiated the Retriangulation of Great Britain in 1936, using metric measures. A metric National Grid was used as the basis for maps published by the Ordnance Survey from World War II onwards; War Office maps had had a metric grid since 1920. The Ordnance Survey decided on full metrication in 1964. The one inch to the mile (1:63,360) range of maps started being replaced with the 1:50000 range in 1969. The metrication of Admiralty Charts began in 1967 as part of a modernisation programme. , road and street maps with primary scales in miles per inch are being marketed under the A-Z brand.

Another example was the Met Office, which began publishing temperatures in both Celsius and Fahrenheit in 1962, and stopped using Fahrenheit in their official reports in 1970.

Many other sectors metricated their operations in the late 1960s or early 1970s. This was not visible to the general public, though the financial pages of newspapers displayed metric prices, e.g. in the principal London commodity markets (the London Metal Exchange, and the various agricultural markets, but not the oil industry).

Costs

The basis of the British metrication programme as announced in 1966 was a voluntary adoption of the metric programme, with the costs being absorbed where they fell. As a result, the costs of and savings from metrication in the United Kingdom have not been comprehensively determined, and studies have tended to focus on specific programmes. As the programme was voluntary, industry was free to take the most cost-efficient approach. In many cases this meant installing equipment calibrated in metric units as part of an ongoing maintenance cycle rather than as part of a specific metrication programme. Such an approach was taken by the gas industry: all newly installed meters record usage in cubic metres, but many older installations still measure in cubic feet.

A 1970s study by the United Kingdom chemical industry estimated costs at £6m over seven years, or 0.25% of expected capital investment over the change period. Other estimates ranged from 0.04% of a large company's turnover spread over seven years to 2% of a small company's turnover for a single year. Many companies reported recouping their costs within a year as a result of improved production.

Some 85% of United Kingdom exports go to metric countries (as only the United States, Liberia, Myanmar have not adopted the International System of Units), and there are costs to business of maintaining two production lines (one for exports to the US in US customary units, and the other for domestic sales and exports to the rest of the world in metric). These costs have been estimated at 3% of annual turnover by the Institute of Production Engineers, and at £1.1 billion (1980) per annum by the CBI. Regardless of United Kingdom metrication, goods produced in the United Kingdom for export to the United States would have still been labelled in non-metric units to comply with the US Fair Packaging and Labelling Act.

In 1978 the cost of converting road signs from miles to kilometres in the United Kingdom was estimated to be between £7.5 million and £8.5 million (1978 prices). A 2005 report pointed to the metrication of the United Kingdom's two million road signs as the major cost of completing the United Kingdom's metrication programme. The Department for Transport (DfT) costed the replacement of all of the United Kingdom's road signs in a short period of time at between £565 million and £644 million. In 2008–09, before the outcome of the consultations that led to the EU directive 2009/3/EC was known, the DfT had a contingency of £746 million for the metrication of road signs.

Regulatory aspects

Adoption of European legislation 

Historically, weights and measures legislation in the United Kingdom only applied to trade, but when the United Kingdom joined the European Economic Community, it had to align its legislation with EEC directives that were in place. These directives included EEC directive 71/354/EEC which related to weights and measures and which required the United Kingdom to formally define in law a number of units of measure, hitherto formally undefined in law, including those for electric current (ampere), electric potential difference (volt), temperature (degree Celsius and kelvin), pressure (pascal), energy (joule) and power (watt).Due to public opposition to metrication (a 1979 survey indicated that, of people who knew about the programme, 46% opposed it and 31% supported it), the programme stalled. In the late 1970s, the UK government asked the EEC to postpone the deadlines for the introduction of metric units. The result was the repeal of directive 71/354/EEC and the introduction of directive 80/181/EEC. This new directive contained a derogation allowing the continued use in the UK, until the end of 1989 (subsequently extended to 1995), of many imperial units then in use for trade. The directive should have been transposed into United Kingdom law by 30 June 1981, but this was not done until the Weights and Measures Act 1985, which also removed from the statute book many imperial units that had fallen into disuse as a result of the completed elements of the metrication programme.
At the end of 1988, the derogation was extended generally until the end of 1994, and until the end of 1999 for the sale of loose goods. This amendment was transposed into United Kingdom law by the Units of Measurement Regulations 1994. At the same time, regulations were passed prescribing metric quantities by which the remaining pre-packaged retail commodities not yet defined in metric terms could be sold.

The number of units of measure to which derogations applied was reduced with effect from 1 October 1995 and reduced further with effect from 1 January 2000. A direct result of the changes that were effective from 1 January 2000 was the requirement that most loose goods sold by weight, volume or length (for example, potatoes or tomatoes that were sold loose, or cheese or meat that was cut or weighed in front of the customer) must be priced and measured using metric units.

The use of the acre as the primary unit for land registration was officially replaced by the hectare on 1 January 2010, under an EU ruling. The acre is still used as a supplementary unit alongside the hectare for land registration.

Since 1 January 2010, the remaining non-metric units, allowed by United Kingdom law without supplementary indicators  for economic, public health, public safety or administrative use, are limited to:
 the mile, yard, foot and inch for road traffic signs, distance and speed measurement,
 the imperial pint for the dispensing of draught beer and cider, and for the sale of milk in returnable containers,
 the troy ounce for transaction in precious metals.

Goods and services sold by a description, as opposed to a price per unit quantity, are not covered by weights and measures legislation; thus, a fence panel sold as "6 foot by 6 foot" is legal, as is a 6 x 4 inch photograph frame, but a pole sold as "50 pence per linear foot", with no accompanying metric price, would be illegal.

Supplementary indicators
In response to the specific requirements of the United Kingdom and of Ireland, both of which were in the process of converting to the metric system, Directive 80/181/EEC incorporated a provision that any unit of measure could be followed by a "supplementary indicator", provided that the supplementary indicator was not the dominant unit and that it was "... expressed in characters no larger than those of the corresponding indication ...". Initially this provision was to have expired in 1989, but it was extended first to 1999 and then to 2009. During the 2007 consultations on the revision of the directive, strong representations were made to retain this provision, as its removal would impede trade with the United States. When the directive was revised in 2009, the "sunset clause" was removed from the text.

The EU directive gives no guidance as to what units may or may not be used as supplementary indicators, but British legislation has restricted the units that may be used in this way for purposes of trade to specified imperial units only.

Furthermore, in the United Kingdom it is still common to see imperial packaging sizes marked with metric units. For example, most jars of jam, packs of sausages and tins of golden syrup are marked 454 g.

There are no restrictions on the units that consumers can use when asking for goods, and the use of supplementary indicators and dual-measure weighing scales (provided these have been calibrated in metric) means that a consumer can see an imperial price, request an imperial quantity and be supplied with the imperial quantity, provided that the seller legally weighs out and sells the metric equivalent.

Scope of the EU Directive
In its initial form, the scope of directive 80/181/EEC was restricted to "economic, public health, public safety and administrative" purposes only. An outcome of the 2007 consultations was a proposal by the EU Commission to extend the scope of the directive to include "consumer protection" and "environmental issues". This was implemented by removing the phrase limiting the scope of the directive, thereby extending it to all matters that come under the ambit of the Internal Market Chapter of the EU Treaty.

The directive specifically excluded units of measurement used in international treaties relating to rail traffic, aviation and shipping such as expressing aircraft altitude in feet.

The United Kingdom's legislation of 2009 that implemented these changes made no reference to the extension of the directive's scope.

Weighing machines

During the 1990s, a series of statutory instruments relating to weighing devices and to the sale of pre-packaged goods were issued to ensure that United Kingdom law on metrology was harmonised with that of its EEC partners. In line with EEC practice, the meaning of weights displayed on pre-packaged goods was changed in 1980 to show the average weight of each item in the batch rather than the guaranteed minimum weight of each individual item. The EU Measuring Instruments Directive (Directive 2004/22/EU) which intends to create a common market for measuring instruments across the countries of the EU came into force on 30 October 2006 with a ten-year transition period.

The EU non-automatic weighing instrument directive (directive 2009/23/EC), which came into force in 2009 and was superseded by directive 2014/31/EU, codified existing regulations regarding the harmonisation of non-automatic weighing devices used for trade, medical purposes or in the preparation of evidence to be heard in court. The directive identified four classes of weighing device ranging from Class I (having a minimum accuracy of 1 part in 50,000) to class IIII (sic) (having a minimum accuracy of 1 part in 100). Devices that fall within the scope of the directive are required to be recalibrated at regular intervals and to have an output showing SI units, except for those used for weighing precious metals or stones. Secondary indications may be shown, provided that they cannot be mistaken for primary indications.

The impact of this directive in the United Kingdom is that most traders cannot legally use weighing devices calibrated in units other than SI units. In 2000, after the deadline for the cessation of selling loose produce by imperial units had passed, some traders continued to sell produce from their market stalls using imperial-only scales. They were variously prosecuted for using unlawful scales, giving short measure and failing to display unit price per kilogram. Five traders, who became known as the Metric Martyrs, appealed unsuccessfully to the High Court, were refused appeal to the House of Lords, and appealed unsuccessfully to the European Court of Human Rights (ECHR).

A LACORS report published in March 2010 highlighting widescale use of inappropriate scales in hospitals, sometimes of domestic quality, recommended that on safety grounds NHS hospitals should use Class III (or better) metric-only scales. A Department of Health alert was subsequently sent to all NHS trusts endorsing these recommendations.

Assessment of the British metrication programme
After the UK government's White Paper on metrication was published in February 1972, the journal New Scientist reported the lack of urgency in the minister's handling of the issue and described how the government refused to use its purchasing power to advance the metrication process. It quoted one (unnamed) metricationalist as saying "[The White Paper] is not firming things up at all. It will turn us into a dual country".

Studies of the British metrication programme included two by US government agencies: NASA in October 1976 and the National Bureau of Standards in April 1979. Both reports noted that the British metrication programme lacked leadership from government. This manifested itself in many ways including:
The failure to appoint the Metrication Board at the start of the metrication programme meant that industry had to take the lead in a programme that affected everybody and did not have the machinery to implement metrication in, especially, the retail sector.
The failure of government to provide funding – much of the initial work was funded by industry itself.
The failure to provide a "champion" for metrication – such a role fell outside the remit of the Metrication Board.
The belief that the programme could be accomplished purely by voluntary means – both reports highlighted the need for appropriate legislation to keep the programme on track.
These sentiments were echoed in the final report of the Metrication Board.

The involvement of the European Commission led metrication to be linked in public debate with Euroscepticism, and traditionally Eurosceptic parts of the British press often exaggerated or invented the extent of enforced metrication. Example stories include the Daily Star, which on 17 January 2001 claimed that beer would soon have to be sold by the litre in pubs, something not demanded in any EU directive.

Reaction to the UK Metric Association report A Very British Mess (2004), the executive summary of which was published in Science in Parliament, was mixed: the Daily Telegraph suggested that the UKMA's assertion of hostility or indifference by the British public to the metric system was due to the lack of cultural empathy rather than it being "foreign or European", while the Economist said that retreat [to the imperial system] was impossible and the current impasse costly.

An Ipsos MORI telephone survey conducted in September 2007 for The Sun newspaper, entitled "Northern Rock, Metric Measurements and the EU Constitutional Treaty" found significant opposition to metrication in response to the question, "How strongly would you support and oppose Britain switching to use entirely metric measurements, rather than continuing to use traditional units?": The greatest variation in opinion was between tabloid and broadsheet readers rather than by age, social class or voting intention.

Current usage

In its final report [1980], the Metrication Board wrote "Today metric units are used in many important areas of British life – including education; agriculture; construction; industrial materials; much of manufacturing; the wholesaling of petrol, milk, cheese and textiles; fatstock markets and many port fish auctions, nearly all the principal prepacked foods; posts and telecommunications: most freight and customs tariffs; all new and revised Ordnance Survey maps; and athletics. Nevertheless, taken as a whole, Britain is far from being wholly metric." The report major identified areas that had not yet been metricated as being the retail petrol trade [metricated in 1984], retail sale of loose goods [metricated in 2000] and road signs [not metricated].

The report did not address issues related to the media such as news reports and advertising.

Retail industry

The regulations that came into force on 1 January 2000 regarding the sale of loose goods effectively made it mandatory to use metric units in the retail industry for most products, though supplementary indicators using certain imperial units were still permitted under UK law. Various price-marking orders prescribed the sizes in which products could be marketed. Some of these restrictions, such as wine being sold in 750 ml bottles, were derived from EU directives, while others, such as the production of bread in 400 g or 800 g loaves, were applicable to the UK only. The principle of the Internal Market, backed up by a judgment of the European Court of Justice, required that any product that was legally produced anywhere in the European Union could, in most cases, be sold anywhere in the EU. Thus a 500 g packet of rye bread, legally manufactured in Germany, could be sold in the United Kingdom even though it was not lawful under British law for a British baker to produce an identical 500 g packet of bread.

A consultation by the EU aimed at bypassing this impasse was launched in 2004. The outcome was Directive 2007/45/EC, which deregulated prescribed packaging of most products, leaving only wines and liqueurs subject to prescribed EU-wide pre-packaging legislation. While this effectively undid much of the work done by the Metrication Board by deregulating prescribed sizing for over 40 products, the law relating to labelling of products has remained unchanged.

Government organisations
The civil service is bound by law to follow EU directives relating to public administration. Government disseminators of information include the Office for National Statistics and the Ordnance Survey office. Both of these, being government departments, use metric units in their work.

Road and rail transport

Motorway marker posts used by road maintenance teams and emergency services demarcate locations in multiples of 100 m. Standards relating to the design and building of new road and rail vehicles have been metric since the engineering changeover in the 1970s. Imperial units have been retained for both road and railway signage except on new railways such as the Channel Tunnel Rail Link, and the Tyne and Wear Metro and London Tramlink which along with all other modern British tram systems also operate in metric. The Cambrian Line has also changed to metric units with the change to ERMTS signalling. London Underground has converted to using metric units for distances but not for speeds.

Apart from the sale of fuel, which was metricated in the 1980s, motorists have seen little metrication. Speedometers and mandatory information on car advertisements such as fuel consumption are given in both metric and imperial units. The 1994 TSRGD permitted the use of metric units alongside imperial units for width and height warning signs and dual metric/imperial signs became mandatory from March 2015. Distances and speed restrictions are shown only in imperial units.

Public opinion

2013 public survey of understanding and use
The UK Metric Association (UKMA) commissioned YouGov to carry out a survey to investigate "public understanding and use of metric and imperial units and of public support for completing the metric changeover". The UKMA executive summary of results of the September and November 2013 survey, published in 2014, presents the following points as the key results:
 Half of respondents were opposed to completing metrication, with a quarter supportive and a fifth indifferent or non-committal.
 Younger generations were more supportive than the older but 36% of the 18–24 age group were opposed (with 33% supportive and 22% indifferent or non-committal).
 Where there are specific practical reasons for using metric units, the majority of the population prefer to use them.
 Where parental, peer and media pressures are strongly in favour of imperial units, all age groups continue to use imperial – including for personal weighing (89% of the over 60s and 64% of the 18–24s).
 There was a definite association between age and acceptance/use of metric units but there was still either a majority or a large minority of younger people who habitually use imperial rather than metric units for various everyday functions.
 Despite opposition to metrication, it was not likely to affect voting intentions in the next general election (when asked to choose 4 issues out of 17 as the most important when deciding how to vote only 1% selected converting from imperial to metric measurements).
The sample size was 1,978 adults in September and 1,878 in November. The results were weighted and are said by YouGov to be representative of all GB adults (aged 18+).

Advocacy groups
A number of advocacy groups exist to promote either the metric or the imperial system. The groups include:

Active Resistance to Metrication, founded by Eurosceptic politician Tony Bennett, is best known for its direct action campaign against metric signs.
 The British Weights and Measures Association campaigns for the retention of imperial measurements in the United Kingdom.

 The UK Metric Association campaigns for the complete replacement of the imperial measurement system with the metric system in the United Kingdom.

Post-Brexit

With the departure of the UK from the European Union on 31 January 2020, the country is no longer bound by EU regulations for commerce in England, Scotland, and Wales. In September 2021, Minister of State for EU Relations David Frost announced the government would be reviewing UK rules requiring metric weights on most goods for sale.

See also
 Metrication opposition

Notes

References

Bibliography